Majstorović is a Bosnian, Croatian and Serbian surname. The surname was derived from the Old French word 'maistre', a superior, a teacher. The name was originally rendered in the Latin form MAGISTER. In early instances this name was often borne by people who were franklins or other substantial freeholders, presumably because they had labourers under them to work their lands, and unlike smaller free tenants did not just till their property themselves. Members of the Croatian branch have been elevated to Croatian nobility. 

It may refer to:

 Ante Majstorović (born 1993), Croatian footballer
 Biljana Majstorović (born 1959), Serbian basketball player
 Borka Majstorović (born 1983), Serbian tennis player
 Daniel Majstorović (born 1977), Swedish footballer of Serb origin
 Darko Majstorović (born 1946), Yugoslav rower
 Dejan Majstorović (born 1988), Serbian basketball player
 Denis Majstorović (born 1989), Croatian-born Italian rugby union player
 Đorđe Majstorović (born 1990), Serbian basketball player
 Ivica Majstorović (born 1981), German footballer of Croatian origin
 Jasna Majstorović (born 1984), Serbian volleyball player
 Mario Majstorović (born 1977), Austrian footballer
 Milan Majstorović (born 1983), Serbian basketball player
 Milica Majstorović (born 1989), Serbian singer
 Neven Majstorović (born 1989), Serbian volleyball player
 Petar Majstorovic (born 1975), Swiss kickboxer of Croatian origin
 Srđan Majstorović (born 1972), Serbian political scientist
 Tomislav Filipović-Majstorović (1915-1946), Bosnian Croat Franciscan friar, Ustashe military chaplain and war criminal

References

Bosnian surnames
Croatian surnames
Serbian surnames